The Biscuit Eater is a 1940 children's film directed by Stuart Heisler and starring Billy Lee and Cordell Hickman as two kids who raise a runt of a dog. It was named one of the Top Ten Films of 1940 by the National Board of Review. Walt Disney Productions made a 1972 remake under the same title.

Plot summary
Harvey McNeil breeds and trains quail bird dogs for his boss Mr. Ames.  His young son Lonnie wants a dog of his own.  Dixie has a litter of pups and Lonnie wants to raise the runt.  Dad explains you have to keep the blood lines strong and the runts need to be killed.  Also any dog that likes to eat chicken eggs is known as a biscuit eater and a poor bird dog because of its attraction to the wrong kind of bird.

Lonnie eventually gets a dog named Promise who he raises with his best friend Text.  Unfortunately Promise likes chicken eggs and Dad orders the dog removed from the farm.  The boys rescue the dog from the man who lives in a swamp.  The boys have many misadventures with rattlesnakes, skunks and shotguns as they secretly train the dog.

To prove that his dog is a worthy bird dog, Lonnie enters 'Prom' into the field trials in direct competition with his father's champion.  Dad orders his son to withdraw but Mr. Ames sees it as a good learning experience for the boy.  Lonnie and Text compete all day and end up in the finals against the father's dog.  Text is told if the father loses, Mr. McNeil may lose his trainer's job.  Lonnie purposely calls his dog off point and loses.

Later that night Promise returns home and as he tries to jump into the dog pen he is shot by the farm hand.  As Lonnie holds his dying dog, he apologizes for not letting him win and calling him a 'biscuit eater'.  The father overhears his son explain how he was protecting his dad's job.   Promise is the sire of the next line of pups.

Cast
Billy Lee as Lonnie McNeil
Cordell Hickman as Text Lee
Richard Lane as Harvey McNeil
Lester Matthews as Mr. Ames
Helene Millard as Mrs. McNeil
Fred Toones as Sermon (as Snowflake)
Tiverton Invader as Promise, aka The Biscuit Eater

References

External links

American children's drama films
American black-and-white films
Films about dogs
Films based on short fiction
Films directed by Stuart Heisler
Films scored by Friedrich Hollaender
Films set in Georgia (U.S. state)
Paramount Pictures films
1940 drama films
1940 films
1940s American films